Eric Walter Elst (30 November 1936 – 2 January 2022) was a Belgian astronomer at the Royal Observatory of Belgium in Uccle and a prolific discoverer of asteroids. The Minor Planet Center ranks him among the top 10 discoverers of minor planets with thousands of discoveries made at ESO's La Silla Observatory in northern Chile and at the Rozhen Observatory in Bulgaria during 1986–2009.

The minor planet 3936 Elst, a stony Vestian asteroid from the inner regions of the asteroid belt, roughly 6 kilometers in diameter, was named in his honour.

Discoveries 

Elst is credited by the Minor Planet Center with the discovery of 3866 numbered minor planets made between 1986 and 2009.

Notable discoveries include 4486 Mithra, a near-Earth and Apollo asteroid, 7968 Elst-Pizarro, which is classified as both asteroid and comet, and more than 25 Jupiter trojans. His discoveries also include:
 binary asteroids such as 4492 Debussy and 15268 Wendelinefroger,
 Amor asteroids such as 21088 Chelyabinsk,
 and many main-belt asteroids such as 9936 Al-Biruni (outer MBA), 12838 Adamsmith (Koronian), 13058 Alfredstevens (Vestian), 13070 Seanconnery (inner MBA), and 13963 Euphrates which orbits in a 2:1 resonance with Jupiter.

Minor planet articles also exist for 12696 Camus, 8116 Jeanperrin, 22740 Rayleigh, 6267 Rozhen and 9951 Tyrannosaurus, among others.

Personal life and death 
Elst was born in Kapellen on 30 November 1936. He died in Antwerp on 2 January 2022, at the age of 85.

See also 
 List of minor planet discoverers

References 
 

1936 births
2022 deaths
20th-century Belgian astronomers
21st-century Belgian astronomers
Discoverers of asteroids
Discoverers of comets

People from Kapellen, Belgium